John Terence Agnew (27 June 1935 – 2002), also known as Terry Agnew, was an English footballer who made 25 appearances in the Football League playing at outside left for Darlington.

Agnew was born in Stockton, County Durham,  He was previously on the books of Sheffield Wednesday without representing them in the League, and made his Darlington debut as a 19-year-old in September 1954 while still a part-time player. After 25 league appearances over two seasons, he joined Midland League club Corby Town in 1956.

Outside football, Agnew completed a doctorate in engineering. His son from his third marriage, Alex Agnew, is a Belgian stand-up comedian.

References 

1935 births
2002 deaths
Footballers from Stockton-on-Tees
English footballers
Association football wingers
Sheffield Wednesday F.C. players
Darlington F.C. players
Corby Town F.C. players
English Football League players
Midland Football League players
Place of death missing